Crocidophora rufalis is a moth in the family Crambidae. It was described by George Hampson in 1893. It is found in Sri Lanka.

References

Moths described in 1893
Pyraustinae